Mia Mohammad Zainul Abedin was a Bangladesh Army General. He was the former Military Secretary to the Prime Minister of Bangladesh from 2011 to 2019. He was a recipient of Bir Bikrom gallantry award.

Early life
Abedin was born on 1 January 1960 in Lohagara, Chittagong District, East Pakistan, Pakistan. He graduated from Faujdarhat Cadet College in Chittagong.

Career
Abedin was commissioned with the 2nd BMA long course in  Bangladesh Army in 1980.

Abedin was placed in charge of Special Security Force in 2009.

On 28 November 2011, he was made the Military Secretary to the Prime Minister of Bangladesh, Sheikh Hasina.

Death
Abedin died on 17 December 2019 in Mount Elizabeth Hospital, Singapore.

References

1960 births
2019 deaths
Bangladesh Army generals
People from Lohagara Upazila
Faujdarhat Cadet College alumni
Recipients of the Bir Bikrom